The Egyptian plover (Pluvianus aegyptius), also known as the crocodile bird, is a wader, the only member of the genus Pluvianus. Formerly placed in the pratincole and courser family, Glareolidae, it is now regarded as the sole member of its own monotypic family Pluvianidae.

The species is one of several plovers doubtfully associated with the "trochilus" bird mentioned in a supposed cleaning symbiosis with the Nile crocodile.

Description
The Egyptian plover is a striking and unmistakable species. The 19–21 cm long adult has a black crown, back, eye-mask and breast band. The rest of the head is white. The remaining upperpart plumage is blue-grey, and the underparts are orange. The longish legs are blue-grey.

In flight, it is even more spectacular, with the black crown and back contrasting with the grey of the upperparts and wings. The flight feathers are brilliant white crossed by a black bar. From below, the flying bird is entirely white, apart from the orange belly and black wing bar. After landing, members of a pair greet each other by raising their wings in an elaborate ceremony that shows off the black and white markings.  The sexes are similar, but juveniles are duller and the black marking are intermixed with brown.

Habitat and range
The Egyptian plover is a localised resident in tropical sub-Saharan Africa. It breeds on sandbars in very large rivers. Despite its vernacular and scientific names, it is not present in modern-day Egypt. However when it was described in 1758 by Carolus Linnaeus, the Egyptian state encompassed much of the territory that the bird is found in, including Sudan, Chad, and Ethiopia.

Behaviour
This usually very tame bird is found in pairs or small groups near water. It feeds by pecking for insects. The call is a high-pitched krrr-krrr-krrr. Due to how tame it is, people often get closer than is safe.

Breeding
Its two or three eggs are not incubated, but are buried in warm sand, temperature control being achieved by the adult sitting on the eggs with a water-soaked belly to cool them. If the adult leaves the nest, it smooths sand over the eggs, though if it is frightened the job may be hasty. The chicks are precocial, and can run as soon as they are hatched and feed themselves shortly afterwards.  The adults cool the chicks in the same way as with the eggs. The chicks may drink water from the adult's belly feathers.  The adults bury the chicks in the sand temporarily if danger threatens.

Supposed relationship with crocodiles

The bird is sometimes referred to as the crocodile bird for its symbiotic relationship with crocodiles. According to Herodotus, the crocodiles lie on the shore with their mouths open and a bird called "Trochilus" flies into the crocodiles' mouths so as to feed on decaying meat lodged between the crocodiles' teeth. The identification of the Trochilus with any particular plover is doubtful and the cleaning symbiosis itself has never been documented by video or photographic evidence.

Gallery

Notes

References

General references

Hayman, Marchant and Prater, Shorebirds 

Egyptian plover
Birds of Sub-Saharan Africa
Egyptian plover
Egyptian plover
Higher-level bird taxa restricted to the Afrotropics